Villar de la Yegua is a municipality located in the province of Salamanca, Castile and León, Spain.  (data from INE), the municipality has a population of 198 inhabitants.

The municipal territory is home to the Siega Verde Paleolithic art site, included in the UNESCO World Heritage List in 2010.

References

Municipalities in the Province of Salamanca